Canyon View may refer to:

Places

Schools
Canyon View High School (disambiguation)
Canyon View Middle School